Gilbert Ashwell (July 16, 1916 – June 27, 2014) was an American biochemist at the National Institutes of Health. He was elected as a member of the National Academy of Sciences for his work with Anatol Morell in isolating the first cell receptor.

Biography
Ashwell was born in Jersey City, New Jersey in  1916. After high school, he went to college to further his education. He attended the University of Illinois, where he earned his B.A.in 1938 and M.S. in 1941. He then went to Columbia University in New York, which was closer to his hometown, to spend two years doing research. In 1950, Ashwell joined the National Institute of Arthritis, Metabolism, and Digestive Diseases. This Institute had grown and later split into two institutes, which are the National Institute of Arthritis and Musculoskeletal and Skin Diseases and the National Institute of Diabetes and Digestive and Kidney Diseases. Ashwell worked at the latter as an emeritus scientist after his retirement.

Ashwell’s research
Ashwell’s goal as a researcher was to devise a labeling serum glycoproteins in order to study the role of ceruloplasmin in Wilson disease.  With another researcher named Anatol G. Morell, he worked to propose that membrane lectins remove senescent circulating glycoproteins, and discovered one of the earliest known carbohydrate receptors. They were able to devise a labeling procedure which allowed them to remove enzymes of the glycoproteins' sialic acid residue. By completing this process, they were able to incorporate other substances into the protein. In 1974, Ashwell and Morell happened to discover that a certain receptor in a human’s liver is able to recognize a specific glycoprotein called asialoglycoprotein.  Ashwell explained that he was not specifically looking for the asialoglycoprotein when he found it.

Ashwell died on June 27, 2014 from pneumonia in a Washington, D.C. area hospital.  He was 97.

See also
Mucin

Sources

External links
Paper dealing with his major discovery
John A. Hanover and William B. Jakoby, "G. Gilbert Ashwell", Biographical Memoirs of the National Academy of Sciences (2015)

1916 births
2014 deaths
American biochemists
Members of the United States National Academy of Sciences